Reginald Robert Stockill (24 November 1913 in York, England – 24 December 1995) was an English footballer.

Career
Stockill started his career with York City, and became the club's youngest-ever first-team player when he made his debut aged 15 years and 281 days, in a Third Division North game against Wigan Borough which city won 2–0 on 29 August 1929. Stockill also scored in the game, a feat of which made him the second most youngest person to ever score in a Football League match and as well York City's youngest ever scorer in the Football League. Stockill only played one more match for York City and eventually moved to non-league Scarborough for a season, before being snapped up by Arsenal in 1931, while still six months shy of his eighteenth birthday.

Stockill made his debut against Huddersfield Town on 27 April 1932 and played the last three games of 1931-32 and the first two of 1932-33, scoring in both, before being displaced by Ernie Coleman. He only played two more games for Arsenal, his final appearance coming as they beat Blackburn Rovers 8–0, in which Stockill scored. After spending all of the 1933-34 season in the reserves he moved to Derby County for £2,000 in September 1934. In total he played 8 games for Arsenal, scoring 4 goals.

At Derby, a serious knee injury incurred in a match on 26 December 1934 kept him out of the game for fifteen months, which severely hampered his career. After five seasons and just 66 league appearances at Derby, he left for Luton Town in 1939. The outbreak of World War II ended his football playing career.

References

External links

1913 births
Footballers from York
1995 deaths
English footballers
Association football forwards
York City F.C. players
Scarborough F.C. players
Arsenal F.C. players
Derby County F.C. players
Luton Town F.C. players